Mercaz HaTorah is a Lithuanian-style Orthodox yeshiva located in the Arnona neighborhood of Jerusalem. 

Mercaz HaTorah was founded by Rabbi Aryeh Rottman, and is currently led by his son, Rabbi Mordechai Rottman, who is the rosh yeshiva (dean).

The yeshiva caters primarily to students from the English-speaking world.

History 
Mercaz HaTorah was founded in 1970 by Rabbi Aryeh Rottman ZT"L through the encouragement of his mentor, Rabbi Chaim Kreiswirth ZT"L, as a post-high school institute for Judaic and Talmudic legal studies. The yeshiva started with 15 students in a two-story building in the Arnona neighborhood of Jerusalem.

Campus and enrollment
While Mercaz HaTorah is still located in its original location, the campus now consists of three spacious buildings.

Current enrollment is 150 students. While students accepted to Mercaz HaTorah are drawn from all over the English-speaking world, they mostly come from the United States. Many of the students are sons of previous alumni.

Curriculum

Mercaz HaTorah places the study of the Babylonian Talmud at the core of its curriculum. The vast body of post-Talmudic literature and commentary is analysed as the foundation of halakha (Jewish law). The classic commentaries of Rashi, Tosafot, Nachmanides, Rashba, and Ritva, in addition to Medieval codifiers such as Maimonides, Ran, Rosh, and Rif are all considered.

To facilitate the student’s Talmudic progress, Mercaz HaTorah has adopted a learning pattern where each academic term highlights a specific Talmudic tractate or segment, which is uniformly studied by the entire student body. The variations in study levels depend upon the year of study the student is in, and whether the course constitutes a survey or an intensive study of the tractate. During the first year, students begin with the Hebraic and Aramaic readings in the structure and style of Talmudic argumentation, as well the interpretive points of the classic commentaries. Second year students acquire mastery of textual readings. The complexities of the Talmudic style, the articulation of the argumentative process and the conclusive decisions of these texts are explored in depth. Lectures focus on the deductive process, as students are encouraged to probe and challenge the various interpretations and comparative textual contradictions.

Students who attain the third year advanced level of Talmudic research and analysis hone their analytic skills in understanding the novella of the Rishonim and the methods of cataloging their diverse halakhic approaches. Study of the Maimonidean Code of Law as a quasi-legally binding discipline, including through its commentaries, is introduced by the process of gleaning Maimonides' interpretative stances in the Talmud from premises evident in his halakhic decisions. Similarly, the interpretive works of prominent Achronim are employed in understanding the legal and theoretical points of the Rishonim. The diverse approaches of leading 19th and 20th-century Talmudic analysts receive prominent attention.

Later developments 

In 2015, family members of Rabbi Chaim Kreiswirth who were associated with Mercaz HaTorah started an offshoot of the yeshiva which is called Toras Chaim. While some of the faculty and students remained, a number of rabbis and students decided to move to the new yeshiva, which opened in August 2015. The two yeshivas now work in harmony to help each student reach their potential.

References

External links
Official Website
Toras Chaim

1970 establishments in Israel
Ashkenazi Jewish culture in Jerusalem
Educational institutions established in 1970
Lithuanian-Jewish culture in Jerusalem
Orthodox yeshivas in Jerusalem